Quinsigamond State Park is a public recreation area comprising two day-use areas along the western shore of Lake Quinsigamond in the city of Worcester, Massachusetts. The Regatta Point area is across North Lake Avenue from the University of Massachusetts Medical School, north of Route 9. The Lake Park area is south of Route 9. The park is managed by the Department of Conservation and Recreation.

Activities and amenities
Races: Lake Quinsigamond has an internationally known 2,000 meter rowing course and is one of the oldest competition rowing sites in the country. The park provides a good place from which to view regattas.
Regatta Point: The  at Regatta Point offer swimming, sailing, picnicking, and fishing facilities. 
Lake Park: The Lake Park area includes a picnic area, swimming beach, and tennis courts.

References

External links

Quinsigamond State Park Department of Conservation and Recreation

State parks of Massachusetts
Parks in Worcester, Massachusetts